The 1924 Summer Olympics, officially the Games of the VIII Olympiad and also known as Paris 1924, were an international multi-sport event held in Paris, France. The opening ceremony was held on 5 July, but some competitions had already started on 4 May. The Games were the second to be hosted by Paris (after 1900), making it the first city to host the Olympics twice.

The selection process for the 1924 Summer Olympics consisted of six bids, and Paris was selected ahead of Amsterdam, Barcelona, Los Angeles, Prague, and Rome. The selection was made at the 20th IOC Session in Lausanne in 1921. The cost of these Games was estimated to be 10,000,000F. With total receipts at 5,496,610F, the Olympics resulted in a hefty loss despite crowds that reached up to 60,000 in number daily. The United States won the most gold and overall medals, having 229 athletes competing compared to France's 401.

Highlights

 The opening ceremony and several sporting events took place in the Olympic Stadium of Colombes, which had a capacity of 45,000 in 1924.
 This VIII Olympiad was the last one organised under the presidency of Pierre de Coubertin.
 The "Flying Finns" dominated the long-distance running, while the British and Americans dominated the shorter events. Paavo Nurmi won the 1500 m and 5,000 m (which were held with only an hour between them) and the cross country run. Ville Ritola won the 10,000 m and the 3,000 m steeplechase, while finishing second to Nurmi on the 5,000 m and cross country. Albin Stenroos won the marathon, while the Finnish team (with Nurmi and Ritola) was victorious in the 3,000 m and cross country team events.
 The British runners Harold Abrahams and Eric Liddell won the 100 m and the 400 m events, respectively. Liddell refused to compete in the 100-metre dash because it was held on a Sunday and he was an observant Christian. Their stories were depicted in the 1981 movie Chariots of Fire. In addition, Douglas Lowe won the 800-metre competition.
 The 1924 Olympics were the first to use the standard 50 m pool with marked lanes.
 Swimmer Johnny Weissmuller won three gold medals in swimming and one bronze in water polo.
 Harold Osborn won gold medals and set Olympic records in both the high jump and the decathlon at the 1924 Olympics. His 6' 6" high jump remained the Olympic record for 12 years, while his decathlon score of 7,710.775 points also set a world record and resulted in worldwide press coverage calling him the "world’s greatest athlete".
 Fencer Roger Ducret of France won five medals, of which three were gold.
 In gymnastics, 24 men scored a perfect 10. Twenty-three of them scored it in the now-discontinued event of rope climbing. Albert Seguin scored a 10 here and also a perfect 10 on side vault.
 Unexpectedly, the national team of Uruguay won the gold medal in football.
 The Olympic motto Citius, Altius, Fortius (Faster, Higher, Stronger) was used for the first time at the Olympics. It had been used before by the Union des Sociétés Françaises de Sports Athlétiques, a French sporting federation whose founding members included Pierre de Coubertin. De Coubertin took the motto from his friend Henri Didon, a Dominican priest who had coined during a speech before a Paris youth gathering of 1891.
 Ireland was given formal recognition as an independent nation in the Olympic Movement in Paris in 1924, and it was at these games that Ireland made its first appearance in an Olympic Games as an independent nation.
 Originally called Semaine des Sports d'Hiver ("Week of Winter Sports") and held in association with the 1924 Summer Olympics, the sports competitions held in Chamonix between 25 January and 5 February 1924 were later designated by the International Olympic Committee (IOC) as the I Olympic Winter Games. (1924 Winter Olympics)
 These were the first Games to feature an Olympic Village.
 The Art competitions at the 1924 Summer Olympics were the first time that the Olympic Art competitions were contested seriously, with 193 entries in five categories. A total of 14 medals were awarded, though none were given in the music category.

Sports

126 events in 23 disciplines, comprising 17 sports, were part of the Olympic program in 1924. The number of events in each discipline is noted in parentheses.

Demonstration sports

Venues

Seventeen sports venues were used in the 1924 Summer Olympics. Stade de Colombes served as the final venue for the 1938 FIFA World Cup between Italy and Hungary.

Participating nations

A total of 44 nations were represented at the 1924 Games. Germany was still absent, having not been invited by the Organizing Committee. China (although it did not compete), Ecuador, Ireland, Lithuania, and Uruguay attended the Olympic Games for the first time, while the Philippines competed for first time in an Olympic Games as a nation (though it first participated in the 1900 Summer Olympic Games, also in this city). Latvia and Poland also attended the Summer Olympic Games for the first time (having both appeared earlier at the 1924 Winter Olympics in Chamonix).

  China, also took part in the Opening Ceremony, but its four athletes (all tennis players) withdrew from competition.

Number of athletes by National Olympic Committees

Medal count

These are the top ten nations that won
medals the 1924 Games.

  Pierre de Coubertin—founder of the IOC & father of the modern Olympics movement—personally awarded 21 Gold medals to members of the 1922 British Mount Everest Expedition including 12 Britons, 7 Indians, 1 Australian and 1 Nepalese.

Legacy
The 1924 Summer Olympics were the second edition of the Summer Olympics to be held in Paris. 100 years later, the city will host the 2024 Summer Olympics, marking the third time the city hosts the games. One venue from the 1924 Games is slated to be used in 2024. The extensively renovated and downsized main stadium, known since 1928 as Stade Olympique Yves-du-Manoir, will host field hockey.

Last surviving competitor
The last surviving competitor of the 1924 Summer Olympics was Croatian swimmer Ivo Pavelić, who died on 22 February 2011 at the age of 103; he competed for Yugoslavia, which Croatia was part of at the time.

See also

 Chariots of Fire

Notes

External links

 
 
 1924 medal winners – from CBS
 Picture of the Olympic Stadium of Colombes
 Original footage of the opening ceremony of the 1924 Summer Olympics (by Polygoon) 
 Olympic games handbook; containing official records of the seventh Olympiad

 
Summer Olympics
Olympic Games
Summer Olympics by year
Summer Olympics in Paris
1924 in Paris